was a Japanese waka poet of the mid-Heian period. One of his poems was included in the Ogura Hyakunin Isshu. He produced a private waka collection, the Michinobu-shū.

Biography 

Born in 972, he was a son of Tamemitsu and adopted by the latter's brother Kaneie.

He served as commander of the guard, and although he died young he was considered a brilliant commander. He died in 994.

Poetry 
Forty-eight of his poems were included in imperial anthologies, and he was listed as one of the Late Classical Thirty-Six Immortals of Poetry.

The following poem by him was included as No. 52 in Fujiwara no Teika's Ogura Hyakunin Isshu:

References

Bibliography 
 
McMillan, Peter. 2010 (1st ed. 2008). One Hundred Poets, One Poem Each. New York: Columbia University Press.
Suzuki Hideo, Yamaguchi Shin'ichi, Yoda Yasushi. 2009 (1st ed. 1997). Genshoku: Ogura Hyakunin Isshu. Tokyo: Bun'eidō.

External links 
List of Michinobu's poems  in the International Research Center for Japanese Studies's online waka database.
Fujiwara no Michinobu on Kotobank.

10th century in Japan
10th-century Japanese poets
People of Heian-period Japan
Fujiwara clan
Japanese nobility
Articles containing Japanese poems
Hyakunin Isshu poets